Nele (meaning: Base) is a 1983 novel written by S.L. Bhyrappa. This book explores a person's life after his death from philosophical point of view. A friend got to see notes of Javarayi, and which has full of philosophical thoughts about life.

Characters
Javarayi  
Kalegowda, friend of Javarayi

References

20th-century Indian novels
Kannada novels
1983 novels
Philosophical novels
1983 Indian novels
Novels by S. L. Bhyrappa